Diplotaxodon aeneus is a species of fish in the family Cichlidae. It is found in Malawi, Mozambique, and Tanzania. Its natural habitat is freshwater lakes.

References

aeneus
Taxa named by George F. Turner
Taxa named by Jay Richard Stauffer Jr.
Fish described in 1998
Cichlid fish of Africa
Taxonomy articles created by Polbot